

The 1927 Stanford football team represented Stanford University in the 1927 college football season. In head coach Pop Warner's fourth season, Stanford was undefeated in the Pacific Coast Conference, with a tie in the game against USC. With a three-way tie for the conference championship, Stanford was chosen to represent the conference in the 1928 Rose Bowl against Pittsburgh, with Stanford winning its first Rose Bowl in its fourth attempt, 7–6.

The team played its home games at Stanford Stadium in Stanford, California and competed in the Pacific Coast Conference.

Schedule

References

Stanford
Stanford Cardinal football seasons
Pac-12 Conference football champion seasons
Rose Bowl champion seasons
Stanford football